"All We Are" is a song composed by the German heavy metal band Warlock, from their 1987 album Triumph and Agony. It was released as the band's fourth single and published by Vertigo Records. A music video for the song was shot by director Mark Rezyka in the Los Angeles river basin and was on heavy rotation on MTV's heavy metal program Headbangers' Ball. The song was published again in every compilation of Warlock songs and is a staple of Doro's live shows to this day.

Track listings
7"
 "All We Are" – 3:19
 "Three Minutes Warning" – 2:30

12"
 "All We Are" – 3:19
 "I Rule the Ruins" – 4:03
 "Cold, Cold World" – 4:01

Warlock line-up
Doro Pesch – vocals
Niko Arvanitis – guitar
Tommy Bolan – guitar
Tommy Henriksen – bass
Michael Eurich – drums

All We Are – The Fight

All We Are – The Fight is an EP by German hard rock singer Doro Pesch, released in 2007 by AFM Records. It is an enhanced CD containing both musical tracks and live videos and videoclips. The title track was released as a single by Doro's former band Warlock in 1987.

The EP shows the subtitle A Tribute to Regina Halmich, because this version of the title track "All We Are" was originally performed on 30 March 2006 on German TV as the entrance song for Doro’s best friend, German boxing champion Regina Halmich. The musicians who performed the song live, Destruction leader Schmier, After Forever guitarist Bas Maas and drummer Tim Hsung, later recorded this new version in studio for this EP. Other songs of the EP come from the recording sessions for the album Warrior Soul, while the duet with Krokus singer Marc Storace comes from the soundtrack of the movie Anuk - Der Weg des Kriegers and also features the director and main star of the movie Luke Gasser on guitar and production.

The song "Babe I'm Gonna Leave You" is a cover of the 1969 Led Zeppelin single from the album Led Zeppelin.

Track listing
"All We Are" (2007 version) (Doro Pesch, Joey Balin) - 3:02
"Thunderspell" (D. Pesch, Chris Lietz) - 4:39
"Everything's Lost" (D. Pesch, Gary Scruggs) - 3:52
"On My Own" (Luke Gasser, Marc Storace) - 3:41
"Babe I'm Gonna Leave You" (Anne Bredon, Jimmy Page, Robert Plant) - 7:11

Video tracks listing
"All We Are" (live 2006) - 7:31
"Above the Ashes" - 4:16
"Warrior Soul" - 2:44
"You're My Family" (live at Sweden Rock Festival) - 3:54
"On My Own" - 3:41

Personnel

Band members
Doro Pesch - vocals
Nick Douglas - bass, keyboards, backing vocals
Joe Taylor - guitars, backing vocals
Johnny Dee - drums, backing vocals
Oliver Palotai - keyboards, guitars, backing vocals

Additional musicians
Schmier - bass, vocals on track 1
Bas Maas - guitars on track 1
Marc Storace - vocals on track 5
Klaus Vanscheidt - guitars
Steve ‘Hef’ Häflinger - guitars
Oli Häller - drums
Tim Husung - drums on track 1
Thomi Imhof - bass
Chris Lietz - guitars, keyboards, producer, engineer, mixing
Torsten Sickert: guitars, keyboards, bass, producer
Luke Gasser - guitar and associate producer on track 5

Production
Deezl Imhof - associate producer, engineer, mixing
Tobi Gmür - associate producer on track 5

Video production
Ronald Mattes (Roaxfilms.de) - tracks 1 and 2
SwedenRock team - track 4
Reinhard Steiner, Luke Gasser - tracks 3 and 5

References

External links
"All We Are" video clip

1987 singles
Warlock (band) songs
Vertigo Records singles